was a Japanese painter, one of the last to paint in the style of the Kanō school. He was one of the first five painters to be appointed as an Imperial Household Artist and was one of the most authoritative painters in Japan at that time.

Biography 

Born in Edo, he studied painting under Kanō Shōsen'in, and was influenced as well by the work of Kanō Hōgai. He created many works in the traditional style of the Kanō school, using color & gold, or otherwise monochrome black ink. But while his paintings are very much the works of a traditionalist, using traditional methods and depicting traditional subjects, Gahō, like Kanō Hōgai, incorporated elements of Western art as well. Brush-strokes, various types of detailing, and in particular, attempts at the proper depiction of perspective are evident in Gahō's paintings and in many others of this period.

He opened his own studio in 1860, but the political and economic upheavals surrounding the Meiji Restoration forced Gahō to seek income in other ways than by selling fine art. He produced maps for the Naval Academy, painted on fans, and used his skills in a number of other ways to earn a living.

Gahō was invited in 1884, by Okakura Kakuzō, to become the chief professor of painting at the Tōkyō Bijutsu Gakkō (東京美術学校, now the Tokyo National University of Fine Arts and Music) which would open five years later. In 1898, Gahō joined Okakura in leaving the Bijutsu Gakkō, and founding the Japan Fine Arts Academy (日本美術院, Nihon Bijutsuin). He would teach there until his death in 1908.

As a result of his position as chief painting professor, Gahō had a number of important pupils, including Yokoyama Taikan and Kawai Gyokudō.

Works

References 

 Baekeland, Freddy (1885). "Hashimoto Gahō." Kodansha Encyclopedia of Japan. Tokyo: Kodansha Ltd.

External links 

 Hashimoto Gahō Japanese painter / Encyclopedia Britannica
 Hashimoto Gaho
 § No. 5 HASHIMOTO Gaho, an artist retained by the Kawagoe Domain at the end of the Edo Period, who created a new style of Japanese painting with OKAKURA Tenshin in the Meiji Period

1835 births
1908 deaths
19th-century Japanese people
20th-century Japanese people
19th-century Japanese artists
20th-century painters
19th-century Japanese painters
20th-century Japanese painters
Imperial household artists
Kanō school
Artists from Tokyo Metropolis